Union Township is one of the sixteen townships of Brown County, Ohio, United States. The 2010 census found 3,064 people in the township, 1,314 of whom lived in the unincorporated portions of the township.

Geography
Located in the southern part of the county along the Ohio River, it borders the following townships:
Byrd Township - northeast
Huntington Township - southeast
Jefferson Township - north
Pleasant Township - northwest
Kentucky lies across the Ohio River to the southwest: Mason County to the south, and Bracken County to the west.

The village of Ripley is located in southwestern Union Township, along the Ohio River.

Name and history
It is one of twenty-seven Union Townships statewide.

In 1833, Union Township contained six gristmills and eight saw mills.

Government
The township is governed by a three-member board of trustees, who are elected in November of odd-numbered years to a four-year term beginning on the following January 1. Two are elected in the year after the presidential election and one is elected in the year before it. There is also an elected township fiscal officer, who serves a four-year term beginning on April 1 of the year after the election, which is held in November of the year before the presidential election. Vacancies in the fiscal officership or on the board of trustees are filled by the remaining trustees.

References

External links
County website

Townships in Brown County, Ohio
Townships in Ohio